The Kingdom of Garahun was a petty kingdom in the confederation of 24 states known as Chaubisi Rajya.

References 

Chaubisi Rajya
Garahun
Garahun
History of Nepal
Garahun